Elachista crenatella is a moth of the family Elachistidae. It is found in the Australian state of South Australia near Adelaide and on Kangaroo Island.

The wingspan is about 11 mm for males. The forewings are bluish grey. The hindwings are pale grey.

The larvae feed on Lepidosperma viscidum. They mine the leaves of their host plant. Young larvae mine upwards, creating a straight and narrow initial stage of the mine. Later, the mine slowly widens and turns downwards. The whole mine, except the last 20 mm, is filled with frass. Pupation takes place outside of the mine on a leaf of the host plant.

References

Moths described in 2011
crenatella
Moths of Australia
Taxa named by Lauri Kaila